Deery is a surname. Notable people with the surname include:

John Deery, English film director
Maurie Deery (born 1947), Australian rules footballer
Tom Deery (born 1960), American football player

See also
Dery
Bob Diry (1884–?), German boxer